is a science fiction writer of more than a dozen novels. His stories are often sociological in nature dealing with issues like disaster and democracy.

Awards
2004: Seiun Award Best Japanese Novel of the Year for 
2006: Seiun Award Best Japanese Short Story of the Year for 
2011: Seiun Award Best Japanese Short Story of the Year for 
2014: Seiun Award Best Japanese Novel of the Year for 
2019: Nihon SF Taisho Award for 
2020: Seiun Award Best Japanese Novel of the Year for

Personal life 
Issui Ogawa was born in Gifu Prefecture, and currently resides in Aichi Prefecture. He is married and has two children.

Bibliography

English translation
 Novels
 Short stories
 "Old Vohl's Planet" (2003) translation by Jim Hubbert in Speculative Japan 2: The Old Man Who Watched the Sea and Other Tales of Japanese Science Fiction and Fantasy (Kurodahan Press, 2011)
 "Golden Bread" (The Future is Japanese, Viz Media, Haikasoru, 2012)
 "To the Blue Star" (Speculative Japan 3, Kurodahan Press, 2012)

Notes

External links
小川遊水池 - Issui Ogawa's web site

Entry in The Encyclopedia of Science Fiction

Japanese science fiction writers
1975 births
Living people